Long Time No See is the third studio album by American singer Chico DeBarge. It was released by Kedar Entertainment and Universal Records on November 18, 1997 in the United States. Chielfy produced by DeBarge, it peaked at number 86 on the US Billboard 200.

Critical reception

AllMusic editor Stephen Thomas Erlewine rated the album three out of five stars. He found that Long Time No See "tries desperately to fit into the trends of the '90s, adding street-level, bass-heavy rhythms and hip-hop beats to his productions [...] Chico weathers the changes quite well, but he can't make the mediocre tracks (and there are too many of them) convincing, and that prevents Long Time No See from being completely successful. Even so, it's a solid, respectable comeback that suggests DeBarge may be able to regain some of the ground he lost in the early '90s."

Track listing

Notes
 signifies a co-producer

Charts

Weekly charts

Year-end charts

Release history

References

External links
 Chico DeBarge discography at Discogs
 DeBarge Back After Tough 'Time' — By J.R. Reynolds of Billboard
 Chico DeBarge Returns — By Jet columnist
 Article: Trouble Man — By Chairman Mao of Vibe

1997 albums
Chico DeBarge albums
Neo soul albums